The Local Void is a vast, empty region of space, lying adjacent to the Local Group. Discovered by Brent Tully and Rick Fisher in 1987, the Local Void is now known to be composed of three separate sectors, separated by bridges of "wispy filaments". The precise extent of the void is unknown, but it is at least 45 Mpc (150 million light-years) across, and possibly 150 to 300 Mpc. The Local Void appears to have significantly fewer galaxies than expected from standard cosmology.

Location and dimensions
Voids are affected by the way gravity causes matter in the universe to "clump together", herding galaxies into clusters and chains, which are separated by regions mostly devoid of galaxies, yet the exact mechanisms are subject to scientific debate.

Astronomers have previously noticed that the Milky Way sits in a large, flat array of galaxies called the Local Sheet, which bounds the Local Void. It is believed that the distance from Earth to the centre of the Local Void must be at least .

The size of the Local Void was calculated due to an isolated dwarf galaxy known as ESO 461-36 located inside it. The bigger and emptier the void, the weaker its gravity, and the faster the dwarf should be fleeing the void towards concentrations of matter, yet discrepancies give room for competing theories. Dark energy has been suggested as one alternative explanation for the speedy expulsion of the dwarf galaxy.

An earlier "Hubble Bubble" model, based on measured velocities of Type 1a supernovae, proposed a relative void centred on the Milky Way. Recent analysis of that data, however, suggested that interstellar dust had resulted in misleading measurements.

Several authors have shown that the local universe up to 300 Mpc from the Milky Way is less dense than surrounding areas – by 15–50%. This has been called the Local Void or Local Hole. Some media reports have dubbed it the KBC Void, although this name has not been taken up in other publications.

Effect on surroundings
Concentrations of matter normally pull together, creating a larger void where matter is rushing away. The Local Void is surrounded uniformly by matter in all directions, except for one sector in which there is nothing, which has the effect of taking more matter away from that sector. The effect on the nearby galaxy is astonishingly large.

List of void galaxies

 
Several void galaxies have been found within the Local Void, these include:

See also

References

Astrochemistry
Interstellar media
Local Sheet
Voids (astronomy)